Xavier Dablemont (born 10 June 1975) is a French former football midfielder.

References

Living people
1975 births
Association football midfielders
French footballers
RC Lens players
Le Mans FC players
FC Gueugnon players
Wasquehal Football players
FC Lorient players
Grenoble Foot 38 players
FC Rouen players
Vendée Fontenay Foot players
Ligue 1 players
Ligue 2 players
Sportspeople from Arras
Footballers from Hauts-de-France